FLG may refer to:
 Endeavor Air, an  American regional airline
 Farmer-Labour Group, a Canadian political party, now the Saskatchewan New Democratic Party
 Flagstaff Pulliam Airport, in Arizona, United States
 Flagstaff station, Arizona
 Filaggrin, encoded by the FLG gene
 Flaming Lotus Girls, an American collaborative art group
 Florida Georgia Line, an American bro-country duo
 Friedhelm Loh Group, a German manufacturing firm
 Friends Life Group, a Guernsey financial firm
 Falun Gong
 FLY LO GANG, a Greek drill team that was established by FLY LO